Qarah Kand (also known as Qarah Kand-e Şedqī, Qareh Kand-e Şedqī, and Qareh Kand-e Şedqīzī) is a village in Sarajuy-ye Jonubi Rural District, Saraju District, Maragheh County, East Azerbaijan Province, Iran. At the 2006 census, its population was 257, in 56 families.

References 

Towns and villages in Maragheh County